Hypatopa cotis is a moth in the family Blastobasidae. It is found in Costa Rica.

The length of the forewings is about 4.5 mm. The forewings are pale brown intermixed with white and few brownish-orange scales. The hindwings are translucent pale brown, gradually darkening towards the apex.

Etymology
The specific name is derived from Latin cos (meaning a hard flint stone).

References

Moths described in 2013
Hypatopa